Meelis Paavel (born 17 June 1963 in Tartu) is an Estonian economic geographer and politician. He was a member of IX Riigikogu, representing the Social Democratic Party.

References

Living people
1963 births
Estonian geographers
Social Democratic Party (Estonia) politicians
Members of the Riigikogu, 1999–2003
University of Tartu alumni
Politicians from Tartu